South Greensboro Historic District, also known as the Asheboro Street Historic District, is a national historic district located in the Southside neighborhood, Greensboro, Guilford County, North Carolina.  The district encompasses 327 contributing buildings, 1 contributing site, 10 contributing structures, and 1 contributing object in a predominantly residential section of Greensboro. The houses were largely built between the 1870s and the 1930s and include notable examples of Queen Anne, Italianate, American Foursquare, and Bungalow / American Craftsman-style  architecture. Notable buildings include the Atkinson House, Hanner House, B.E. Jones House, T. Bernard House, C.O. Younts House, W.S. Witherspoon House, and R. N. Watson House, former Asheboro Street Church (now Skeenes Chapel, 1910-1913), and Nettie Mae Coad Apartments (c. 1922).

It was listed on the National Register of Historic Places in 1991.

References

Historic districts on the National Register of Historic Places in North Carolina
Italianate architecture in North Carolina
Queen Anne architecture in North Carolina
Buildings and structures in Greensboro, North Carolina
National Register of Historic Places in Guilford County, North Carolina